Julyana Al-Sadeq (born 9 December 1994) is a Jordanian taekwondo athlete. She won the gold medal at the 2018 Asian Games on the women's 67 kg weight category.

References

External links
 

Jordanian female taekwondo practitioners
Living people
1994 births
Sportspeople from Amman
Taekwondo practitioners at the 2014 Asian Games
Taekwondo practitioners at the 2018 Asian Games
Asian Games gold medalists for Jordan
Asian Games medalists in taekwondo
Medalists at the 2018 Asian Games
Asian Taekwondo Championships medalists
Islamic Solidarity Games medalists in taekwondo
Islamic Solidarity Games competitors for Jordan
Taekwondo practitioners at the 2020 Summer Olympics
Olympic taekwondo practitioners of Jordan
21st-century Jordanian women